George Brimhall may refer to:

 George H. Brimhall (1852–1932), President of Brigham Young University
 George W. Brimhall (1814–1895), his father, politician in territorial Utah